Cle Elum may refer to:
Cle Elum, Washington
South Cle Elum, Washington
Cle Elum Lake
Cle Elum River